Silva Golde (4 August 1955 – 31 December 2013) was a Latvian politician and educator, who served as a deputy to the Saeima and Minister of Education and Science.

References 

1955 births
2013 deaths
Politicians from Liepāja
People's Party (Latvia) politicians
Liepāja Party politicians
Ministers of Education and Science of Latvia
Deputies of the 7th Saeima
Deputies of the 8th Saeima
Women government ministers of Latvia
21st-century Latvian women politicians
Women deputies of the Saeima